The 1981 Mid-Eastern Athletic Conference men's basketball tournament took place March 5–7 at Winston-Salem Memorial Coliseum in Winston-Salem, North Carolina.  defeated , 66–63 in the championship game, to win the MEAC Tournament title.

The Bison earned an automatic bid to the 1981 NCAA tournament as a No. 12 seed in the West region.

Format
All six conference members participated, with play beginning in the quarterfinal round. Teams were seeded based on their regular season conference record. This was the final time a third-place consolation game was played.

Bracket

* denotes overtime period

References

MEAC men's basketball tournament
1980–81 Mid-Eastern Athletic Conference men's basketball season
MEAC men's basketball tournament
Basketball competitions in Winston-Salem, North Carolina
College basketball tournaments in North Carolina